Kenneth Wayne Bushnell (October 16, 1933 - October 4, 2020) was an American visual artist, who was born in Los Angeles.  He earned a BA from the University of California, Los Angeles in 1958, and then moved to Hawaii, where he received an MFA from the University of Hawaiʻi in 1961.  He taught painting at the University of Hawaiʻi at Mānoa from 1961 to 1981, and was appointed chairman of the Art Department in 1991.  He married fellow artist Helen Gilbert (1922 - 8 April 2002) in 1995.  Bushnell eventually earned the title of professor emeritus, living in Honolulu.

Bushnell is best known for his geometric abstract paintings, although his work also includes sculpture, light sculptures, wall reliefs, films, multimedia theater and environmental designs.  His acrylic painting on cotton from 1982, Double Square Series No. 6 is in the collection of the Honolulu Museum of Art.  It is typical of his geometric abstract paintings.  For more than 25 years, Bushnell has been working on the Euclidean Dream Cycle which is built upon equilateral triangles and arcs of its altitude.  The Bibliothèque nationale de France, the British Museum, the Brooklyn Museum, the Honolulu Museum of Art, the Museum of Modern Art (New York City), and the Whitney Museum of American Art (New York City) are among the public collections holding work by Kenneth Wayne Bushnell.

References
 Biller, Leslie & Kenneth Bushnell, Bushnell, Contemporary Art Center, Honolulu, 1977
 Ellis, George R., Kenneth Bushnell (Euclidian Dream Cycle: New Works by Kenneth Bushnell), Honolulu Academy of Arts, 2000
 Haar, Francis and Neogy, Prithwish, Artists of Hawaii: Nineteen Painters and Sculptors, University of Hawaii Press, 1974, pp. 34–41
 Hartwell, Patricia L. (editor), Retrospective 1967-1987, Hawaii State Foundation on Culture and the Arts, Honolulu, Hawaii, 1987, p. 22
 Morse, Morse (ed.), Honolulu Printmakers, Honolulu Academy of Arts, Honolulu, Hawaii, 2003, p. 75
 Morse, Marcia, Kenneth Bushnell: Spaces of Reason and Delight (The Euclidian Dream Cycle: New Work), Honolulu Academy of Arts, 1986
 Wisnosky, John and Tom Klobe, A Tradition of Excellence, University of Hawai'i, Honolulu, 2002, pp. 28–31
 Yoshihara, Lisa A., Collective Visions, Hawaii State Foundation on Culture and the Arts, Honolulu, 1997, p. 87.

External links
 Kenneth Bushnell in AskArt.com
 kennethwbushnell.com Artist Portfolio Site

Footnotes

1933 births
20th-century American painters
American male painters
21st-century American painters
Artists from Hawaii
2020 deaths
20th-century American male artists